Juan Téllez-Girón, the saint, 4th Count of Ureña (in full) (25 April 1494 – 19 May 1558) was a Spanish nobleman.

Juan Téllez-Girón was born in Osuna, the third son of Juan Téllez-Girón, 2nd Count of Ureña and of Leonor de la Vega Velasco, daughter of Pedro Fernández de Velasco, 2nd Count of Haro. He succeeded to the titles of his older brother in 1531. He married María de la Cueva y Toledo, daughter of Francisco Fernández de la Cueva, 2nd Duke of Alburquerque and they had 6 children.

In 1549, he founded a College and University in Osuna. He was nicknamed the saint because he also created a Franciscan and a Dominican monasteries in his Osuna domains.

See also 
 Collegiate Church of Osuna

Sources

1494 births
1558 deaths
104
Juan
Juan